The Baghdad Airport Road is a 12-kilometre (7.5 mi) stretch of highway in Baghdad, Iraq linking the Green Zone, a heavily fortified area at the centre of Baghdad, to Baghdad International Airport (BIAP). It also links different parts of Baghdad to the Airport and connects neighbouring areas to each other. It became prominent after the 2003 invasion of Iraq following its capture by the Coalition Forces. Although it was commonly referred to by the military Main Supply Route (MSR) designation Route Irish, the route from the International Zone to the airport stretches over two MSRs: Route Aeros, the section leading into and out of the International Zone, and Route Irish, which stretches east from the airport, then turns south (past the junction with Route Aeros) to a junction with Highway 1 (MSR Tampa).

Because of heavy military traffic and high-profile convoys, the route from the International Zone to the airport was extremely dangerous in the years following the invasion. The many roadside bombs, suicide bombers attacking its checkpoints, drive-by shootings and random shooting from the areas on both sides of the road have led to its notoriety. In late 2004 after aggressive patrolling by 1/7th Cavalry, the 1st Cav 4/5 ADA (Dakota and Foxtrot Batteries), and the 1/69th Infantry during Operation Wolfhound the road became safer and more reliable.

In 2008, Baghdad Airport Road underwent construction to repair and repave the road. A beautification and redevelopment plan for the road was announced in 2010 in anticipation of the Arab Summit in 2011.

References

Transport in Baghdad
Roads in Iraq
Occupation of Iraq